Fryer's is an international fast-food chain focused on hamburgers, fried chicken, french fries, and milkshakes. Its headquarters is in the Richmond, BC area, and is currently owned and operated by Fryer's International, Inc. Established in 1989, the Fryer's chain expanded to 46 locations scattered throughout North America between 1989 and 2002.

In early 2004, the chain began franchising, and in just 1 year, permits had been sold for over 100 franchised locations, catching the attention of the national restaurant industry. As of 2013, Fryer's has locations open throughout the United States, Canada and Middle East.

Slogans
US – Canada
1989–1991: can’t eat just one
1991–1993: Eat it your way!
1993–1995: because its awesome
1995–2001: Call !t Quality
2001–Present: Quality You Can Trust 
International
2007–Present: Eat so good for so little! (Bahamas)
2009–Present: its Fryer’s time! (Costa Rica)
2010–Present: leave the rest... taste the best! (Mexico)

History
Fryer's was founded on April 20, 1989, in Toronto, Canada. The first restaurant was established as a 20-stool counter operation, Originally the chain consisted of only dine-in facilities, but after the success and customer's demand, most locations have since added drive-through.

In the media
In 2005, the company was featured in the TV series Alias.

Locations

 United States
 Bahamas
 Brazil (opened February 2014)
 Canada
 Costa Rica
 Dominican Republic
 Mexico
 Pakistan (opened June 2013)

References

External links
Fryer’s official website
Fryer's Canada website
Fryer's Pakistan website

Food and drink companies of Canada
Fast-food chains of Canada
Fast-food chains of the United Kingdom
Fast-food franchises
1989 establishments in British Columbia
Companies based in Richmond, British Columbia
Regional restaurant chains in the United States
Fast-food chains of the United States
Fast-food hamburger restaurants
Canadian brands
Restaurants established in 1989
Food and drink companies based in British Columbia